Britomart may refer to:

 Britomartis, a nymph of Greek mythology 
 A character in Edmund Spenser's epic poem The Faerie Queene
 Lady Britomart Undershaft, a character in George Bernard Shaw's play, Major Barbara.
 HMS Britomart, seven ships of the Royal Navy
 G-ACOY Britomart, a Boulton & Paul P.71A mailplane 
 LNWR Experiment Class 4-6-0 No. 2645 Britomart
 A Hunslet quarry locomotive named Britomart
 Point Britomart, a former headland between former Commercial Bay, and Official Bay, Auckland, New Zealand
Britomart Transport Centre, Auckland's CBD public transport hub, located in the area of the former headland
Fort Britomart, a fortification of the British Army during early colonial days, located on the headland